William Monckton-Arundell, 2nd Viscount Galway (died 18 November 1772) was an English peer and MP.

He was born c. 1725, the eldest surviving son of John Monckton, 1st Viscount Galway and the elder brother of Lieutenant-General Robert Monckton, Governor of New York. William was educated at Westminster School and succeeded his father as Viscount Galway in July 1751. His inheritance included the Grade I listed Serlby Hall in Nottinghamshire. In 1769 he inherited further estates from his maternal aunt, Lady Frances Arundell of Allerton Mauleverer, adopting the additional surname of Arundell in accordance with the terms of her will.

He was MP for Pontefract, a seat controlled by the Galway family, from 1747 to 1748. He was then elected MP for Thirsk (1749–1754) before being returned a second time for Pontefract (1754–1772). He was made Master of the Staghounds from 1765 to 1770.

He died in 1772. He had married Elizabeth, the daughter of Kitty da Costa and Joseph Isaac Villareal, with whom he had 3 sons and 2 daughters. He was succeeded as Viscount in turn by his sons Henry William (1749–1774) and Robert Monckton-Arundell, 4th Viscount Galway (1752–1810).

References

1772 deaths
People educated at Westminster School, London
Viscounts in the Peerage of Ireland
Members of the Parliament of Great Britain for English constituencies
British MPs 1747–1754
British MPs 1754–1761
British MPs 1761–1768
British MPs 1768–1774